Childress Army Airfield is a former World War II military airfield, located 4.8 miles west of Childress, Texas.  It operated as a Bombardier training school for the United States Army Air Forces from 1942 until 1945.

History
Childress Army Airfield was initially authorized on 2 May 1942 and occupied an area of 2,474 acres.  Construction of the field began immediately thereafter.  An activation ceremony was held on 27 October 1942, and Col. John W. White assumed command on 24 November.  The base was assigned to the Army Air Forces Central Flying Training Command.

The initial mission of Childress AAF was bombardier training and was one of the "West Texas Bombardier Quadrangle" schools of the Army Air Forces Training Command.  The other bases in the quad were Midland Army Airfield, San Angelo Army Airfield and Big Spring Army Airfield.

Training was performed with the Beechcraft AT-11 Kansan. In addition, navigation training was added on 4 June 1943. Units assigned to the base were:
 Army Air Forces Bombardier School
 Student Training Squadron 4
 Student Training Squadron 8
 488th Bombardier Training Group
 361st Sub-Depot
 331st Aviation Squadron
 457th Base Headquarters and Air Base Squadron
 1108th First Maintenance Squadron
 1108th Second Maintenance Squadron
 80th Bombardier Training Group
 1097th Guard Squadron
 857th Signal Company
 Detachment, 908th Quartermaster Company (Aviation Service)
 Detachment, 2052d Ordnance Company (Aviation Service)
 325th Army Air Forces Band

Operations

The Bombardier School opened and accepted its first class of cadets began training in late February 1943 and graduated in May. Members of this class (43-7) were dubbed the "Valentine of Steel" class, in reference to a dummy bomb that Mrs. White decorated as a Valentine to Hitler. Subsequent classes arrived at three-week intervals through the rest of the war and participated in an initial training program of eighteen weeks, later increased to twenty-four. Those who completed the work were designated flight officers or commissioned as second lieutenants.

The base produced the first classes qualified in both precision bombing and dead-reckoning navigation. In  years Childress AAF graduated thirty-five classes of bombardier-navigators; its 4,791 graduates made a tenth of the total World War II air force bombardier production.

The first "All-American Precision Bombing Olympics" was held at Childress in May 1943 with seven air fields participating. Such meets were held there and at other training bases at three-week intervals thereafter until April 1944. A special practice feature was skip-bombing on Lake Childress.  A redeployment program for veteran bombardiers was instituted at the field to give retraining in line with development of bombing techniques.

The War Department also established a prisoner of war camp at the base.

Childress was renamed the 2512th Army Air Forces Base Unit on July 1, 1944.

Postwar use
After the field was closed on December 21, 1945, it was given to the city and transformed into a municipal airport.  Childress Municipal Airport is a commercial airport located within city limits, 4 miles west of central Childress, Texas. It is owned and operated by the city of Childress, Texas. A feature item of the CAAF museum exhibit is the Norden Bombsight, the great secret weapon of World War II, which was housed at CAAF during the war and was used to train bombardier pilots. It was stored in a vault in a small building which still stands (although in ruin) at the site of the airfield.

See also 

 Texas World War II Army Airfields
 34th Flying Training Wing (World War II)
 Bombardier (film), a 1943 fictional war drama about the training program for bombardiers of the United States Army Air Forces.

References

External links
  Bombs Away Class 43-10 Yearbook, Army Air Forces Bombardier School, Childress Army Air Field, Childress, Texas
 Childress Army Air Field 1943 Yearbook
 On Course Class 145, Childress Army Air Field, Childress, Texas

Airfields of the United States Army Air Forces in Texas
Military installations closed in 1945